The Mark 7 helmet  is the current general issue combat helmet of the British Armed Forces. Officially known as the GS (General Service) Mark 7 combat helmet, it replaced the previous Mark 6A helmet and Mk 6 helmet. 

The helmet is manufactured by NP Aerospace.

History
The Mk 7 helmet was introduced in June 2009 as an Urgent Operational Requirement. It was first shown through the Defence Vehicle Dynamics (DVD) event in Millbrook alongside the Osprey body armour. The British Ministry of Defense announced a purchase of 10,000 sets under initial contracts worth £16 million. 

In November 2010, three soldiers from the Royal Irish Regiment credited the helmet for saving their lives when they engaged in a gunfight with Taliban forces. In July 2011, a soldier from the Brigade Reconnaissance Force also credited the helmet from nearly being killed during a gunfight in Helmand province. Defence Science and Technology Laboratory, based in Afghanistan, was asked to assess the damage done to his helmet. Several Mk 7 helmets were donated to the Ukrainian military in 2014. 

The Mk 7 helmet was replaced by the Revision Military Batlskin Cobra Plus helmet as part of the Virtus programme.

Design
The Mk 7 offers the same ballistic protection as the Mk 6A, but its new shape allows a soldier to lie flat and shoot straight, without the rear rim digging into the body armour and tipping the front rim over their eyes. 

The helmet weights , significantly less than its  predecessor. It also has better chin strapping for stability and is produced in a new colour - tan, unlike the Mk 6A in black and Mk 6 in olive. It's made based on the same ballistic nylon as the Mk 6.

This is the velocity at which half (50%) of projectiles are expected to penetrate and is a measure of the helmet's ballistic protection.

Users

 : In 2014, the Mk 7 was donated for Ukrainian troops.
 : Issued the Mk 7 together with the Osprey body armor in June 2009.

References 

Combat helmets of the United Kingdom
Post–Cold War military equipment of the United Kingdom
British Army equipment
Military equipment introduced in the 2000s